Clyde Germany Trammell, Sr. (July 22, 1892 – 1953) was a member of the Florida House of Representatives from Brevard County, Florida from 1929 to 1933. He served as mayor of Melbourne, Florida from 1932 to 1933.

He was the son of Eramus Ripley Trammell and Sara Roberta Germany. He was the first cousin of Park Trammell, Governor of Florida.

From November 1939 to May 1941, he was County Attorney for Levy County, Florida.

See also 
 List of members of the Florida House of Representatives from Brevard County, Florida

References 

1892 births
1953 deaths
Florida lawyers
Mayors of Melbourne, Florida
Democratic Party members of the Florida House of Representatives
People from Lakeland, Florida
20th-century American politicians
20th-century American lawyers